Umbilical vessels can refer to:
 Umbilical artery, one of a pair of blood vessels that supply deoxygenated blood from within the fetus to the placenta
 Umbilical vein, a blood vessel that carries oxygenated blood from the placenta into the fetus